The Brantford Golf & Country Club  is a private golf course and curling club located in Brantford, Ontario, Canada. It is the fourth oldest golf club in North America having been founded in 1879. The course is ranked 46 in 2010 Scoregolf Top 100 Courses in Canada.

Course history

The first course consisted of four holes and was located at what was known as Vinegar Hill. Sometime after 1883 with the popularity of golf growing, the course was moved to Glenmount which is located north of Henry Street and east of West Street. The property is now occupied by Arrowdale Golf Club.

In 1906, the course moved to the current site which is located next to Glenhyrst Art Gallery and along the Grand River. The course consisted of 9-holes until 1919 when the membership decided to purchase an additional 69 acres to expand to 18-holes.

The 18 holes were principally designed by Nicol Thompson and George Cumming while Stanley Thompson oversaw the project. The course comprised three par-3 holes, three par-5 holes and the remaining holes being par-4. The course stretched 6,300 yards.

A major redesign was approved in December 1960. C.E Robinson headed the redesign. The course was lengthened to about 6,800 yards, greens were replaced, fairway bunkers were added and the stream was re-routed and widened to create water hazards. The most recently renovations to the course have been completed by Graham Cooke.

Major tournaments

Annual tournaments
Walter Gretzky CNIB Golf Classic
The Great Lakes Tour Moe Norman Cup

Notable members
David Hearn
Alena Sharp
Moe Norman
Nicole Vandermade
Jennifer Kirby

References

External links 
 
 Brantford GCC at the Stanley Thompson Society

Golf clubs and courses in Ontario
Sport in Brantford
Curling clubs in Canada
Curling in Ontario